Haris Bratanovic (born 20 April 2001) is a Belgian basketball player for BC Oostende and .

Early career
At age 17, Bratanovic left his team Falco Gent to play for the youth department of FC Barcelona.

Professional career
In the 2018–19 season, Bratanovic made his debut in the Spanish LEB Gold with FC Barcelona Bàsquet B. On 2 March 2020, it was announced he broke his contract with Barcelona.

On 29 April 2020, Bratanovic signed a 5-year contract with BC Oostende until 2025.

Honours

Club
Oostende
Pro Basketball League: (2021)
Belgian Cup: (2021)
BNXT Supercup: (2021)

Individual
BNXT League Belgian Rising Star of the Year: (2022)

References

Living people
2001 births
BC Oostende players
Belgian men's basketball players

Centers (basketball)
Sportspeople from Ghent
Belgian expatriate basketball people in Spain